Giza is a city in Egypt.

Giza may also refer to:

People
Barbara Giza (1550–1589), Polish mistress
Jakub Giża (b. 1985), Polish shot putter
Piotr Giza (b. 1980), Polish footballer

Places
Giza Governorate, in Egypt
Giza Peak, a mountain in Antarctica
Giza pyramid complex

Music
Giza (EP), an extended play by Gatekeeper
Giza Studio, a Japanese record label

Other uses
FF Giza, a Faroese football club
5249 Giza, a minor planet

See also

Ginza (disambiguation)